Events from the year 1762 in Ireland.

Incumbent
Monarch: George III

Events
February – Roman Catholic nobility and gentry offer support to King George III in the Seven Years' War in the Iberian Peninsula.
20 March – a French privateer takes six ships off Youghal.
30 April – acts grant security to Protestants who have acquired property from Catholics.
Old St. Thomas's Church, Dublin, in Marlborough Street, is completed.
Watt distillery in Derry is established; it will produce Tyrconnell (whiskey).

Arts and literature
14 May – Charles Macklin's The True-Born Irishman is first performed at the Crow Street Theatre in Dublin.
Approximate date – James Barry paints Baptism of the King of Cashel.

Births
11 January – Andrew Cherry, playwright, songwriter, actor and theatrical manager (died 1812 in Wales).
24 February – Gideon Ouseley, Methodism's 'apostle to the Irish' (died 1839).
20 May – Eyre Coote, British Army officer (died 1832).
1 June – Edmund Ignatius Rice, Roman Catholic missionary and educationalist, founder of the Congregation of Christian Brothers and the Presentation Brothers (died 1844).
12 June – Chambré Brabazon Ponsonby-Barker, politician (died 1834).
25 December – Michael Kelly, actor, singer and composer (died 1826).
Henry Browne Hayes, sheriff and abductor (died 1832).
Approximate date – John Chetwode Eustace, Roman Catholic priest and antiquary (died 1815 in Italy).

Deaths
20 February – Chambré Brabazon Ponsonby, politician (born c.1720).
20 March – James Cuffe, landowner (born 1707).
22 March – Courthorpe Clayton, soldier and courtier.
September
Francesco Geminiani, violinist and composer (born 1687 in Italy).
Seán Ó Murchadha, poet.
16 November – John Boyle, 5th Earl of Cork, writer (born 1707).
30 December – Robert Blakeney, politician (born c.1724).
Macnamara Morgan, playwright and barrister (born c.1720).
Charles Smith, topographer and apothecary (born 1715).

References

 
Years of the 18th century in Ireland
Ireland
1760s in Ireland